Massimiliano Scaglia (born 21 May 1977) is a former Italian defender.

Career 
Scaglia started his professional football career as an 18-year-old with Salernitana. Failing to break into the first team, he joined U.S. Alessandria Calcio 1912, spending seven seasons with them before moving to Serie B side A.C. Ancona. He had limited game time with Ancona, so returned to Serie C1 with ACF Fiorentina in January 2003, helping them to promotion that season. He then joined A.S. Bari as part of Jaime Valdés's deal.

Scaglia moved to Treviso in the summer of 2007. He joined Gallipoli in August 2009 on a free transfer.

Scaglia represented Padania at the 2008 Viva World Cup. In July 2010, he was signed by Verona.

Personal life 
Massimiliano is the brother of Valentina Scaglia, a professional ballet dancer based in the Netherlands.

References

External links
http://aic.football.it/scheda/3439/scaglia-massimiliano.htm
 Profile at La Gazzetta dello Sport (2007-08) 

1977 births
Footballers from Turin
Living people
Italian footballers
U.S. Alessandria Calcio 1912 players
A.C. Ancona players
ACF Fiorentina players
S.S.C. Bari players
Treviso F.B.C. 1993 players
A.S.D. Gallipoli Football 1909 players
Hellas Verona F.C. players
F.C. Pro Vercelli 1892 players
Serie B players
Serie C players
Association football defenders